A MEMS thermal actuator is a microelectromechanical device that typically generates motion by thermal expansion amplification.  A small amount of thermal expansion of one part of the device translates to a large amount of deflection of the overall device.  Usually fabricated out of doped single crystal silicon or polysilicon as a complex compliant member, the increase in temperature can be achieved internally by electrical resistive heating or something by a heat source capable of locally introducing heat. Microfabricated thermal actuators can be integrated into micromotors.

Types of thermal actuators 

Asymmetric (bimorph)
Symmetric (bent beam, chevron)

Other types of MEMS Actuators 

Electrostatic — parallel plate or comb drive
Magnetic
Piezoelectric
Thermostatic — linear motion, paraffin wax drive

References

Actuators
Materials science
Nanoelectronics
Microtechnology